Dinosaur Stampede National Monument at Lark Quarry Conservation Park (also known just as Lark Quarry or Dinosaur Stampede) in Queensland, Australia is considered to be the site of the world's only known record of a dinosaur stampede, with fossilised footprints are interpreted as a predator stalking and causing a stampede of around 150 two-legged dinosaurs. This interpretation has been challenged in recent years, with evidence suggesting it may have been a natural river crossing.

The fossils date to either the Albian or Turonian periods between 104 to 92 million years ago, and are part of the Winton Formation sandstone. In 2015, Winton Shire Council invited the Australian Age of Dinosaurs Museum of Natural History to take over the operation of public guided tours at Dinosaur Stampede National Monument. This joint initiative, implemented in April 2016, provides visitors with a broader understanding of unique Australian dinosaurs and the world they inhabited. In 2018, Dinosaur Stampede National Monument received 14,180 visitors.

Origin
The traditional account is that 104 to 92 million years ago, a group of perhaps 180 chicken-sized coelurosaurs and Bantam to emu-sized ornithopods were disturbed by the arrival of a single much larger theropod, perhaps Australovenator or a related form, which may have been up to 6 metres long with 50-centimetre feet. The two smaller track types are placed within their own ichnotaxa Skartopus (small coelurosaurs) and Wintonopus (ornithopods), while the larger tracks were referred to cf. Tyrannosauropus and originally interpreted as a large theropod.

The Skartopus and Wintonopus trackmakers were thought to have stampeded past the cf. Tyrannosauropus trackmaker (that walked in the opposite direction), leaving thousands of footprints in lake sediment. However, in 1994 the ichnotaxon Tyrannosauropus were identified as large plant-eater dinosaur tracks, and when combined with analyses to distinguish three-toed carnivore and herbivore dinosaur footprints the large tracks attributed to Tyrannosauropus at Lark Quarry were interpreted as being produced by a large herbivore similar to Muttaburrasaurus, rather than by a predatory theropod, and were suggested to belong to the ichnogenus Amblydactylus instead.

Research by Anthony Romilio and colleagues casts doubt on the original interpretation. Analysis of the sediments indicates that they were deposited by a seasonal water course with water flowing at different depths and speeds at different times. The footprints were most likely made over a period of time, perhaps several days, by dinosaurs crossing the channel. The authors also found the shape variation of Skartopus and Wintonopus overlapped and were even preserved within the same individual trackway. With no significant difference in the form of the footprints, the authors attributed both Skartopus and Wintonopus were made by the same type of herbivorous bipedal dinosaur trackmakers.

Whatever actually took place, not long after the incident, the water level began to rise, covering the tracks with sandy sediments before the mud had dried. The footprints were buried beneath sand and mud as the water levels continued to rise and fall. Over thousands of millennia, the rich river plain with sandy channels, swamps and lush lowland forest dried up. The sediment covering the footprints was compressed to form rock.

Discovery and preservation
The footprints were first discovered in the 1960s by station manager, Glen Seymour, in the nearby Seymour Quarry.

Palaeontologists from the Queensland Museum, including Mary Wade and Tony Thulborn and the University of Queensland excavated Lark Quarry during 1976–77 (the quarry was named after Malcolm Lark, a volunteer who removed a lot of the overlying rock.) All together they removed more than 60 tonnes of rock, and uncovered about 210 square metres of the layer with the fossils. This shows about 3300 dinosaur footprints.

A sheltering roof was built over the site but did not stop the gradual damage caused by exposure to the weather. The present Conservation Building that covers the trackways was constructed in 2002. This building protects the main collection of footprints from damage by stabilising temperature and humidity fluctuations, stops water running over the footprints and keeps people and wildlife off the footprints themselves.

The Dinosaur Stampede National Monument was included in the Australian National Heritage List on 20 July 2004, for values of rarity and research.

It has been claimed that the Lark Quarry tracks served as inspiration and "scientific underpinning" for the Gallimimus stampede scene in the film Jurassic Park; these tracks were initially interpreted as representing a dinosaur stampede caused by the arrival of a theropod predator. The idea that the tracks represent a stampede has since been contested, and a consultant to Jurassic Park has denied the tracks served as inspiration for the movie.

See also

 List of fossil sites
 Protected areas of Queensland

References

External links
Lark Quarry Dinosaur Trackways - official site
Queensland Government tourist information about Lark Quarry

Dinosaur trace fossils
Fossil trackways
Australian National Heritage List
Conservation parks of Queensland
Fossil parks in Australia
Museums in Queensland
Natural history museums in Australia
Fossil museums
Central West Queensland
Paleontology in Queensland